The rock band Dire Straits released six studio albums between 1978 and 1991, including Brothers in Arms, which sold over four million copies in the United Kingdom. They also released 23 singles, as well as several live and compilation albums.

Albums

Studio albums

Compilation albums

Live albums

Box sets

Extended plays

Singles

Home video

Music videos

References 

Discographies of British artists
Dire Straits
Discography